A mooring in oceanography is a collection of devices connected to a wire and anchored on the sea floor. It is the Eulerian way of measuring ocean currents, since a mooring is stationary at a fixed location. In contrast to that, the Lagrangian way measures the motion of an oceanographic drifter, the Lagrangian drifter.

Construction principle
The mooring is held up in the water column with various forms of buoyancy such as glass balls and syntactic foam floats. The attached instrumentation is wide-ranging but often includes CTDs (conductivity, temperature depth sensors), current meters (e.g. acoustic Doppler current profilers or deprecated rotor current meters), and biological sensors to measure various parameters. Long-term moorings can be deployed for durations of two years or more, powered with alkaline or lithium battery packs.

Components

Top buoy

Surface buoys
Moorings often include surface buoys that transmit real time data back to shore. The traditional approach is to use the Argos System. Alternatively, one may use the commercial Iridium satellites which allow higher data rates.

Submerged buoys
In deeper waters, areas covered by sea ice, areas within or near shipping lines or areas that are prone to theft or vandalism, moorings are often submerged with no surface markers. Submerged moorings typically use an acoustic release or a Timed Release that connects the mooring to an anchor weight on the sea floor. The weight is released by sending a coded acoustic command signal and stays on the ground. Deep water anchors are typically made from steel and may be as large as 100 kg. A common deep water anchor consists of a stack of 2–4 railroad wheels. In shallow waters anchors may consist of a concrete block or small portable anchor.

The buoyancy of the floats, i.e. of the top buoy plus additional packs of glass bulbs of foam, is sufficient to carry the instruments back to the surface. In order to avoid entangled ropes, it has been practical to place additional floats directly above each instrument.

Instrument housing

Prawlers
Prawlers (profiling crawlers) are sensor bodies which climb and descend the cable, to observe multiple depths.  The energy to move is "free," harnessed by ratcheting upward via wave energy, then returning downward via gravity.

Depth correction
Similar to a kite in the wind, the mooring line will follow a so-called (half-)catenary.
The influence of currents (and wind if the top buoy is above the sea surface) can be modeled and the shape of the mooring line can be determined by software.  If the currents are strong (above 0.1 m/s) and the mooring lines are long (more than 1 km), the instrument position may vary up to 50 m.

See also
 Benthic lander, a mooring which does not have any mooring line

References 

Oceanography
Physical oceanography
Oceanographic instrumentation
Ocean currents
Biological oceanography

de:Boje (Schifffahrt)